Jack Nuttall (30 January 1929 – 20 August 1992) was an Australian rules footballer who played with Footscray in the Victorian Football League (VFL) during the 1950s. 

A defender, Nuttall was a reserve in Footscray's 1954 premiership winning side.

References

External links
 

1929 births
1992 deaths
Australian rules footballers from Victoria (Australia)
Western Bulldogs players
Western Bulldogs Premiership players
One-time VFL/AFL Premiership players